Christine Rose is a New Zealand political advocate, a former Councillor and Deputy Chair of the Auckland Regional Council. She is a marine mammal advocate, an environmentalist, an artist and writer, and a cheerleader for cycling.

Political career

Auckland
Rose was Deputy Mayor of the Rodney District Council and then represented the Rodney constituency in the Auckland Regional Council. She chaired the Regional Council's transport and urban development committee, the top transport decision making body of the council.

In her position, she worked for a more sustainable transport system, favouring projects like a reintroduction of trams to the Auckland waterfront, improved efficiency in public transport such as bus services and the construction of a walk and cycleway over the Auckland Harbour Bridge.

She has also in the past spoken out against the creation of an independent traffic entity apart from the future Auckland "Supercity" Council, believing a unit integrated into the normal Council structure would be preferable. She believed that the "corporate" model proposed does not fit the needs of Auckland - and that from her own experience of the problematic relationship between the Auckland Regional Council collecting the rates, and the Auckland Regional Transport Authority having responsibility for operational matters, she similar issues would occur in the case of an Auckland-wide body. She has however, expressed support for the "Supercity" concept in general, and declared that she would contest the Rodney seat in the Auckland Council. Rose lost this election to former Rodney mayor Penny Webster. Rose stood in the Rodney electorate for Labour at the 2011 General election. She stood as a candidate in the 2013 elections, for the post of one of Auckland Council's Waitākere Ward Council seats but failed to be elected despite an endorsement from retiring councillor Sandra Coney. 

Rose is a writer, artist, animal rights advocate and social entrepreneur (especially arts, and the environment), an environmentalist and environmental commentator. She is a marine conservationist. She has led regional and national campaigns to protect the critically endangered Maui's and Hector's dolphins from human induced threats, particularly set-nets, and pollution. Rose also campaigns to protect whales and their habitat.  She often uses quirky public arts and activities to highlight environmental, social and transport issues. In 2020 she organised, through her Cetacean Spotting NZ Facebook group, the country's first nationwide Citizen Science Cetacean Census.

She continues to campaign for community and public arts, Trains to Huapai, walking and cycling across the Auckland harbour bridge, marine conservation and animal rights. 

Rose has a BA with First Class Honours in politics and philosophy, and has done five years PhD study in Local Government Politics.

References 

People from Auckland
Living people
New Zealand Labour Party politicians
Unsuccessful candidates in the 2011 New Zealand general election
Auckland regional councillors
Year of birth missing (living people)
Sentientists